United Nations Security Council Resolution 75, adopted on September 27, 1949, after receiving a General Assembly resolution authorizing the council to make decisions on the matter the Council decided to retroactively reimburse the Member States that were participating in the United Nations Commission for Indonesia and the United Nations Commission for India and Pakistan for their traveling and substance expenses.

The resolution passed with a total of seven votes, while the Ukrainian SSR voted against it and Cuba, Egypt and the Soviet Union abstained.

See also
List of United Nations Security Council Resolutions 1 to 100 (1946–1953)

References
Text of the Resolution at undocs.org

External links
 

 0075
Indonesian National Revolution
September 1949 events